Chrysophyllum sparsiflorum is a tree in the family Sapotaceae, native to South America.

Description
Fascicles feature up to 25 green flowers.

Distribution and habitat
Chrysophyllum sparsiflorum is native to Bolivia, Brazil, Guyana and Venezuela. Its habitat is in lowland rainforest.

References

sparsiflorum
Flora of Bolivia
Flora of Brazil
Flora of Guyana
Flora of Venezuela
Plants described in 1863